Jamming with Edward! is a 1972 album by three Rolling Stones band members (Mick Jagger, Charlie Watts and Bill Wyman) accompanied by Nicky Hopkins and Ry Cooder.

Background
The album was recorded at London's Olympic Studio on April 23, 1969, during the Let It Bleed sessions, and released on Rolling Stones Records in 1972. It consists of a series of loose jams performed by band members while waiting for Keith Richards to return to the studio. The reason for Richards' absence is uncertain; though it is commonly believed that he walked out over Cooder being brought in as a support guitarist, producer Glyn Johns has attributed his absence to a phone call from his girlfriend Anita Pallenberg. Although Jamming with Edward! reached No. 33 on the US charts in February 1972 during an 11-week stay, it failed to make the UK listings.

"Edward" is a nickname for pianist Nicky Hopkins, originating from some earlier studio conversation between Hopkins and another Rolling Stone, Brian Jones. Hopkins also contributed the cover art. In the original liner notes, Mick Jagger describes the album as "a nice piece of bullshit... which we cut one night in London, England while waiting for our guitar player to get out of bed. It was promptly forgotten (which may have been for the better) ... I hope you spend longer listening to this record than we did recording it." On the CD version there are additional notes written by Mark Paytress adding more context and describing the result as a "curio to top all curios, perhaps".

Johns said of the album: "[It] was just a joke really, just a laugh. I recorded it and they played it, and then, I don't know how long later, we dug the tapes out, I mixed it and they stuck it out on album. It didn't really warrant releasing really, but it was okay, a bit of fun, and there's some good playing on it."

According to Rolling Stone, the release was delayed several months due to the appearance of an expletive on the back cover art, which was partially covered with stars in the ultimate release.

Remaster
Jamming with Edward! was remastered and reissued by Virgin Records in 1994.

Track listing

Personnel
Ry Cooder – guitar
Mick Jagger – harmonica, vocals
Charlie Watts – drums
Nicky Hopkins – keyboards, piano
Bill Wyman – bass guitar

Chart performance

References

1972 albums
Albums produced by Glyn Johns
Collaborative albums
Mick Jagger albums
Rolling Stones Records albums
Ry Cooder albums
Virgin Records albums
The Rolling Stones